S2 is a line on the Berlin S-Bahn. It operates from Bernau to Blankenfelde over:
the Berlin-Szczecin railway, opened on 1 August 1842 and electrified on 8 August 1924,
the Nord-Süd-Tunnel, opened on 28 May 1936 from Humboldthain to Unter den Linden and on 6 November 1939 to Anhalter Bahnhof and Priesterweg
the Berlin–Dresden railway, opened on 17 June 1875 and electrified on 15 May 1933.

References

Berlin S-Bahn lines